Bliznetsov is a Russian masculine surname, its feminine counterpart is Bliznetsova. It may refer to
Hennadiy Bleznitsov (Russian Gennadiy Bliznetsov; born in 1941), Soviet pole vaulter
Pavel Bliznetsov (1913–1989), Russian priest

Russian-language surnames